Annie Servais-Thysen (18 June 1933 – 6 April 2022) was a Belgian politician. A member of the Reformist Movement, she served in the Parliament of Wallonia from 1995 to 2004. She died in Liège on 6 April 2022 at the age of 88.

References

1933 births
2022 deaths
Belgian women in politics
Walloon politicians
Reformist Movement politicians
Members of the Parliament of Wallonia
Members of the Parliament of the French Community
Complutense University of Madrid alumni
People from Ans, Belgium